Göstling an der Ybbs is a municipality in the district of Scheibbs in the Austrian state of Lower Austria.

Population

Twin towns
Göstling an der Ybbs is twinned with:

  Hüttenberg, Germany
  Purkersdorf, Austria

References

Cities and towns in Scheibbs District